Czesław Prądzyński (born 24 August 1960 in Piece) is a Polish former sprinter who specialised in the 200 metres. He represented his country in the 4 × 100 metres relay at the 1983 World Championships finishing sixth in the final. He later won a bronze medal at the 1984 Friendship Games which were organised for the countries boycotting the 1984 Summer Olympics.

International competitions

Personal bests
Outdoor
100 metres – 10.32 (+1.9 m/s, Grudziądz 1986)
200 metres – 20.70 (+1.7 m/s, Lublin 1984)
Indoor
200 metres – 21.23 (+1.9 m/s, Turin 1984)

References

All-Athletics profile

1960 births
Living people
Polish male sprinters
People from Starogard County
Friendship Games medalists in athletics
20th-century Polish people